The  ("school for the training of native physicians") or STOVIA was a medicine school in Batavia, now Indonesia's capital Jakarta. The school was officially opened in March 1902 in a building that is now the Museum of National Awakening in Weltevreden, an affluent district of Batavia.

Reference

Notable alumni
Djamaluddin Adinegoro, journalist
Djoehana Wiradikarta, biologist

Medical schools in Indonesia
Dutch East Indies
Educational institutions established in 1902
Schools in the Dutch East Indies
1902 establishments in the Dutch East Indies